K cell may refer to:

 k-cell (mathematics)
 Intestinal cells which synthesize gastric inhibitory polypeptide
 Natural killer cell
 Koniocellular cell
 Knudsen cell
 The unit cube of dimension k
 Kcell, a Kazakhstani mobile phone operator